Chocim is the Polish name for Khotyn, a city in Ukraine.

Chocim may also refer to the following villages in Poland:
Chocim, Greater Poland Voivodeship (west-central Poland)
Chocim, Opole Voivodeship (south-west Poland)